Shiveh or Shivah in Iran may refer to:
 Shiveh, South Khorasan
 Shiveh, West Azerbaijan
 Shivah, Zanjan